Vernonia coerulea is a species of perennial plant in the family Asteraceae. It is endemic to the Lesser Sunda Islands.

References

coerulea
Flora of the Lesser Sunda Islands